The following table presents a listing of Argentina's provinces and its autonomous city, ranked in order of their Human Development Index. The last report is from 2021 and covers data from 2019. It is elaborated by the Radboud University Nijmegen.

Provinces

See also
List of Argentine provinces by gross domestic product

References

External links
Programa de las Naciones Unidas para el Desarrollo en Argentina
Revista Regional sobre Desarrollo Humano

eleconomista.com.ar

Provinces
Human Development Index
Argentina
Argentina